Khawaraoji is a village located in the Dausa district of the Indian state of Rajasthan.,

Geography 
Khawaraoji is a village located in the Dausa district of Rajasthan, India. It is known for its beauty and the old kingdom of Rao Rajputs. It is located around 26 km from Dausa. 

The village is surrounded by the Aravali hills on one side, and the rest is covered by Khawaraoji Fort. It is known for the red stone which is used in the architecture. Two forts are located in Khawaraoji Village; one on top of the hill and another in the foothills.

Khawaraoji is located near the Golden Tourism triangle of India (Delhi, Jaipur, Agra). The nearest airport is the Jaipur Airport with a travel distance of 86.6 km.

Hapawas, Paparda is nearest village to Khawaraoji.

Kingdom of Khawaraoji 
The kingdom was established in 800 AD. The Rao Rajpoot Kshatriya rulers era began in the 16th century. 210 villages were under the control of the kingdom. Khwaraoji was never ruled by the Mughals, Jaipur Kingdom or the British Empire. Khawaraoji is the fief of Thikana during the Rajpoot Khstriyas period. Rao Vishwak singh chauhan is the king

Khawaraoji Fort (Hotel Khawa Palace) 
The old Fort was renovated as a heritage hotel (Hotel Khawa Palace) with ancient architecture and a display of heritage. The fort is located on the upper part of the village. Thakur Karan Singh Rao built this palace in 1653 to rule his Kingdom. The fort is surrounded partly by Amol Ghati, and the rest by mountains that offer a panoramic view.

References 
 Falling Rain Genomics, Inc – Dausa
 "Census of India 2001: Data from the 2001 Census, including cities, villages and towns (Provisional)". Census Commission of India. Archived from the original on 2004-06-16. Retrieved 2008-11-01.
 "Culture Of Dausa". Retrieved 24 May 2011.

Villages in Dausa district
Tourist attractions in Dausa district